Spatalistis alleni is a species of moth of the family Tortricidae. It is found in Thailand.

The wingspan is about 13 mm. An incomplete postbasal fascia and terminal parts of the forewings are yellow, while the remaining area is brownish with orange rust suffusions and some blackish dots. The largest is black and found at the apex. The hindwings are whitish, tinged with brownish in the posterior third and with whitish at the apex.

Etymology
The species is named Mr M. G. Allen, a collector of Lepidoptera in south-east Asia.

References

Moths described in 2012
alleni
Moths of Asia
Taxa named by Józef Razowski